Route 7 Gateway is a census-designated place (CDP) in the town of Ridgefield, Fairfield County, Connecticut, United States. It is on the east side of Ridgefield, bordered to the east by the town of Redding and to the northeast by the city of Danbury. U.S. Route 7 runs through the center of the CDP, leading north into Danbury and south to Norwalk. Connecticut Route 35 splits off Route 7 to the southwest in the center of the CDP, leading to the center of Ridgefield.

Route 7 Gateway was first listed as a CDP prior to the 2020 census.

References 

Census-designated places in Fairfield County, Connecticut
Census-designated places in Connecticut